Ferruccio Diena (born in Turin) was an Italian professional football player.

His younger brother Armando Diena also played for Juventus. To distinguish them, Ferruccio was known as Diena I and Armando as Diena II.

Year of birth missing
Year of death missing
Italian footballers
Serie A players
Juventus F.C. players
Association football defenders